Lockwood/Eastwood is a light rail station in Houston, Texas on the METRORail system. It is served by the Green Line and is located on Harrisburg Boulevard at Hagerman Street in the East End. The station is named for nearby Lockwood Drive as well as Eastwood Park.

Lockwood/Eastwood station opened on May 23, 2015 as part of the Green Line's first phase.

References

METRORail stations
Railway stations in the United States opened in 2015
2015 establishments in Texas
Railway stations in Harris County, Texas